Fatehpur Lok Sabha constituency is one of the 80 Lok Sabha (parliamentary) constituencies in Uttar Pradesh state in northern India. This constituency covers the entire Fatehpur district.

Vidhan Sabha segments
 Most Lok Sabha constituencies in Uttar Pradesh have five assembly segments under them, but Fatehpur Lok Sabha seat comprises six Vidhan Sabha segments.

Members of Lok Sabha

^ by poll

Election results

General election 2019

General election 2014

General election 2009

1967 Lok Sabha Elections
 S.B. Singh (INC) : 101,649 votes   
 Brij Lal Verma (IND) :  76,092

See also
 Fatehpur district
 List of Constituencies of the Lok Sabha

References

External links
Fatehpur lok sabha  constituency election 2019 result

Lok Sabha constituencies in Uttar Pradesh
Fatehpur district